PNS/M Shushuk (S132) (nicknamed: "Dolphin"), was a  diesel-electric submarine based on the French  design. She was designed, built, and commissioned at Toulon, France. She was in service from 12 January 1970 until 2 January 2006.

She was laid down on 1 December 1967 at Toulon in France by the French DCNS, and launched on	30 July 1969, commissioned in the Pakistan Navy on 12 January 1970.

She saw active actions during the western front of the third war with India when she was deployed in Arabian Sea to conduct submarine operations against the Indian Navy, and safely reported back to its base after the ceasefire reached between two nations.
After her war service, she voyaged to the Kamafuli river in Bangladesh and paid a goodwill visit through the Yangon River in Burma, and served on various military missions of the Navy.

On 2 January 2006, she was decommissioned having completed 36-years of service with the Pakistan Navy.

References

External links
 
 

1969 ships
Ships built in France
Hangor-class submarines (Daphné-class)